L. David Marquet [mar-'kay] is a retired United States Navy captain and the bestselling author of Turn the Ship Around and Leadership is Language. He was the commander of the submarine USS Santa Fe. He turned the submarine from the worst in the fleet to the most successful by using a "leader-leader" model of leadership. He became captain of the submarine in 1999 and, since his retirement, the submarine has continued to win awards.

Since then he has worked as a leadership expert and speaks to audiences globally about creating workplaces where people are healthier and happier because they have more control over their work. He taught previously at the Columbia University School of Professional Studies.

References

External links 
 Website

United States submarine commanders
Leadership scholars
United States Navy captains
United States Naval Academy alumni